Reggae Sunsplash is a reggae music festival first staged in 1978 in the northern part of Jamaica. In 1985 it expanded with the addition of an international touring festival. The festival ran annually until 1996, with a final event in 1998, before it was revived in 2006. The festival returned for a virtual staging in 2020 produced by Tyrone Wilson, Randy Mclaren and Debbie Bissoon.

History
The Reggae Sunsplash festival was the brainchild of five Jamaicans - Tony Johnson, Don Green, Ronnie Burke, John Wakeling, Ed Barclay. The five founding directors created a company called Synergy Productions Ltd, which was responsible for promoting and producing the Reggae Sunsplash festival.

The first Reggae Sunsplash festival was staged at Jarrett Park, Montego Bay, Jamaica, in June 1978 and began at dusk and continued until dawn for seven days. With the help of Peter Martin, a longtime Jamaican tourism stalwart and his public relations firm, Peter Martin Associates, the Sunsplash Festival was able to gain international exposure. It was billed as the "biggest Reggae festival in the history of the world". The festival introduced the concept of music and travel as a boost to tourism in Jamaica. Prior to the staging of Reggae Sunsplash, the hotels in Jamaica were traditionally closed during the summer period. The five founding partners staged the festival each year for a number of years and successfully created an annual summer tourist season in Jamaica. The success of Reggae Sunsplash led to a wave of annual music festivals in Jamaica and the Caribbean islands. The festival's popularity led to a shortage of hotel rooms and a tradition of camping out on local beaches.

To promote Jamaica as a tourist and travelling target in Europe, the Jamaica Tourist Board invited in 1983 the German band Supermax as opening act of the annual festival in Montego Bay.
From 1981 the festivals were filmed and recorded, with several videos and albums released, the first being Reggae Sunsplash '81: Tribute to Bob Marley, released by Elektra Records. From 1987 the festival included a sound clash event, with finalists from a national sound system competition competing as a precursor to the rest of the festival. The festival also expanded to include an 'oldies night' featuring stars from past eras of Jamaican music. For many years the festival was emcee's by Tommy Cowan.

In 1984 the Reggae Sunsplash festival also expanded into international events with a one-day festival staged at Selhurst Park in London, England. In 1985 the Reggae Sunsplash World tour was launched in the USA and Japan and subsequent years saw the Reggae Sunsplash festival touring extensively throughout North America, Europe, South America and the Far East. 1991 saw the introduction of a "Caribbean Night" featuring other Caribbean music such as soca, and the following year the festival's scope increased further with the addition of a "World Beat Night".

While the festival had become hugely popular, opening new global tourist niche markets to Jamaica and attracting millions of dollars of foreign exchange into the country, it had not been a financial success, largely due to the lack of sponsorship or government support. In 1995 the Chairman of the Jamaica Tourist Board operating through a company called Radobar Holdings Ltd offered financial assistance in exchange for equity in Synergy Productions, the founders of Reggae Sunsplash. This initial offer was never consummated and in a disputed claim Radobar Holdings announced the formation of a company called Reggae Sunsplash International in Jamaica and proceeded with the hostile take over of the Reggae Sunsplash festival. The first attempt at staging Reggae Sunsplash without the original owners Synergy Productions in 1996 was a financial disaster for the new claimants. In 1997 the Reggae Sunsplash festival was postponed until 1998 when it was timed to coincide with celebrations of the birth of Bob Marley but more losses were incurred. More futile attempts at recapturing the original spirit of the Reggae Sunsplash festival were never replicated by the Radobar group.

The festival was re-established by the Johnson family in 2006, but it was not successful. The international touring festival, however, has continued.

Three of the founding directors, John Wakeling, Tony Johnson and Ed Barclay died and with the passing of Tony Johnson a number of individuals have tried to claim the rights to the festival unsuccessfully and all have failed to recapture the spirit of the legendary Reggae Sunsplash. Don Green and Ronnie Burke are the two remaining Reggae Sunsplash founders alive.

In August 2015 it was announced that Burke would be awarded the Order of Distinction by the Jamaican government in recognition of his contribution to the development of Jamaican music.

Reggae Sunsplash returned as a virtual festival on November 27-28, 2020 after a 14-year absence. Performers included Tanya Stephens, Richie Spice, Capleton, Masicka, Dexta Dapps, Jesse Royal, Agent Sasco, and Romain Virgo.

Dates and venues
1978: June 23–30, Jarrett Park, Montego Bay
1979: July 3–7, Jarrett Park, Montego Bay
1980: July 2–5, Ranny Williams Entertainment Center, Kingston
1981: August 4–8, Jarrett Park, Montego Bay
1982: August 3–7, Jarrett Park, Montego Bay
1983: June 28-July 2, Bob Marley Center, Montego Bay
1984: August 7–11, Jarrett Park, Montego Bay
1985: August 6–10, Jarrett Park, Montego Bay
1986: August 26–30: Jarrett Park, Montego Bay
1987: August 18–22, Bob Marley Center, Montego Bay
1988: August 15–22, Bob Marley Center, Montego Bay
1989: August 14–19, Bob Marley Center, Montego Bay
1990: June 24, Pine Knob Music Theater, Clarkston, MI
1990: July 16–21, Bob Marley Center, Montego Bay
1991: July 26–31, Bob Marley Center, Montego Bay
1992: August 3–8, Bob Marley Center, Montego Bay
1993: August 3–7, Jamworld, Portmore
1994: August 1–6: Jamworld, Portmore
1995: July 12–14, Dover, St. Ann
1996: August 1–4, Chukka Cove, St. Ann
1998: February 5–8, Reggae Park, St. Ann

2006: August 3–6, Richmond Estate, Priory, St. Ann

Albums
Big Youth - Live At Reggae Sunsplash (1982), Sunsplash/Trojan
Chalice - Live At Reggae Sunsplash (1982), Pipe Music
Yellowman - Live At Reggae Sunsplash (1982), Sunsplash
Eek-A-Mouse & Michigan & Smiley - Live at Reggae Sunsplash (1983), Sunsplash
The Gladiators & Israel Vibration - Live at Reggae Sunsplash (1983), Sunsplash
Toots & The Maytals - Live At Reggae Sunsplash (1983), Sunsplash
The Twinkle Brothers - Live At Reggae Sunsplash 82 (Since I Throw The Comb Away), (1983), Sunsplash
The Mighty Diamonds & Mutabaruka - Live At Reggae Sunsplash, Genes

Various Artists
Reggae Sunsplash '81: Tribute to Bob Marley (1981), Elektra
Best of the Festival - Day One Live at Reggae Sunsplash 1982 (1982), Sunsplash
Reggae Sunsplash Live (1982), RCA
Sunsplash Live (1983), 56 Hope Rd
Reggae Sunsplash '86 (1986), Bellaphon
Best of Reggae Sunsplash (1994), Genes

Video
Reggae By Bus (1979)(AKA Reggae Sunsplash II), a Film By Stefan Paul (The first Sunsplash on film)Reggae Sunsplash 10th Anniversary 1987(001)(Phase Three Productions)(Synergy)
Reggae Sunsplash Dancehall 88, Charly (VHS)
Reggae Sunsplash - 10th Anniversary Of Reggae Sunsplash - Dancehall X, Charly (VHS)
Reggae Sunsplash Dancehall '89 (1990), Charly (VHS)
Reggae Sunsplash '90, Variety Night, Charly (VHS)
Reggae Sunsplash Dancehall Special, Charly
Reggae Sunsplash Music Festival - Best Of Sunsplash 1991 (1992), Warner Music Vision (VHS)
All Time Best of Reggae Sunsplash Music Festival (1993), Warner Music Vision (VHS)
Reggae Sunsplash II (2003), Columbia (DVD)
Cool Runnings: The Reggae Movie (2005), Xenon (DVD)
The Best Of Reggae Sunsplash (2006), 4digital (DVD)

See also
List of reggae festivals
Reggae
Reggae Sumfest

References

Further reading
Immanuel-I, Java (2010) Reggae Sunsplash 1978-1998, Caribbe Incorporated,

External links
Reggae Festival Guide

Music festivals in Michigan
Electronic music festivals in Jamaica
Concert tours
Reggae festivals in the United States
Music festivals established in 1978
Reggae festivals in Jamaica
Summer events in Jamaica